The Park Theatre is a neighbourhood movie house on Cambie Street in Vancouver, British Columbia. Opened in 1941, it has passed through several owners, including Odeon Theatres, Famous Players and Alliance Atlantis Cinemas, and in 2005 was renovated and became part of the Festival Cinemas chain. It was acquired by Cineplex Entertainment in 2013 after the Festival chain ceased operations.

History

The Park was built in 1940 by the architectural firm Kaplan & Sprachman, who designed over 300 cinemas between the 1920s and 1960s, including the Vogue Theatre in Vancouver and the Uptown in Toronto. The Park opened on August 4, 1941 and was originally run by Odeon Theatres.

In 1984, Odeon Theatres became Cineplex Odeon Corporation, and in 1990 Cineplex Odeon decided not to renew the Park's lease. The theatre was taken over by Leonard Schein's Festival Cinemas, which at various times also has run the Ridge, the Plaza, the Varsity, the Starlight, the Vancouver East and Fifth Avenue Cinemas.

Alliance Atlantis bought Schein's company in 1998, and he remained in management there until 2001, when he decided to retire from the movie-theatre business. The Park was run by a partnership of Alliance and Famous Players for a few years, but they decided not to renew its lease in 2005.  Schein, who was by then involving himself in projects such as the Canadian Cancer Society, Friends of Larry Campbell and Doctors Without Borders, hadn't been planning to get back into the movie business. However, phone calls from the building's landlord and local business owners and residents convinced him to lease the theatre and reopen it.

Renovations

Schein spent over $300,000 renovating the Park Theatre. Famous Players had taken everything from the building except a toilet and sink, and since Schein was left with a shell, and had to compete with other theatres, he decided to make the cinema as inviting as possible. Vancouver architect Elizabeth MacKenzie redesigned the interior of the building, and Brad Busby coordinated the construction work, which was done by sub-contractors. New seats were added (down to 504 from 640), with seat rows staggered to allow everyone to have a good view of the new 18-by- 36-foot screen. A Dolby Digital sound system was installed, as were new flooring and lights. The exterior has mostly been kept the same to preserve the historical element of the cinema.

Notes

Cinemas and movie theatres in Vancouver
Cinema of British Columbia